Jackknife Bar, or simply Jackknife, was a bar in Portland, Oregon. The 4,000-square-foot cocktail bar was housed in the Sentinel Hotel, before closing in May 2020, during the COVID-19 pandemic.

Description
The interior featured a 50-seat, 65-foot-long curved marble and wood-lined bar, as well as a domed stained glass ceiling.

History
Jake Carey and John Janulis opened the bar in April 2014, with Justin Diaz overseeing the bar operation and Erik Paulsen as chef. Russell Van der Genugten became executive chef in March 2015.

In 2019, a man was removed from the bar for wearing a shirt with the text "Anti-Fascist"; Jackknife's parent company Lightning Bar Collective (Sweet Hereafter, Victoria Bar) said the policy against clothing promoting hate groups was "misinterpreted" by a contracted security guard.

The bar closed in May 2020, during the COVID-19 pandemic.

Reception
Eater included Jackknife in a list of the "most beautiful restaurants" in the U.S. Samantha Bakall said the bar has a "relaxed vibe that heats up as the night goes on". In his 2019 list of "Best Bars for Single Mingling in Portland", Pete Cottell of Thrillist described Jackknife as a "moderately fancy hotel bar ... that's known for eclectic DJ nights, tasty cocktails, and an overall vibe that celebs like Bruno Mars or Pharrell would probably dig."

See also

 Impact of the COVID-19 pandemic on the restaurant industry in the United States

References

External links
 
 Jackknife Bar at Thrillist
 Jackknife Bar at Zomato

2014 establishments in Oregon
2020 disestablishments in Oregon
Defunct drinking establishments in Oregon
Restaurants disestablished during the COVID-19 pandemic
Restaurants disestablished in 2020
Restaurants established in 2014
Southwest Portland, Oregon